Mendarda is a city in Junagadh district of the state of Gujarat with a population of approximately 23,031. The closest tourism destination to Mendarda is Girnar Other close by tourism destinations include Junagadh, Sasan Gir and Gondal. The nearest major railway station to Mendarda is Junagadh Junction (JND) which is at a distance of 30 kilometers. The nearest airport is Rajkot, which is at a distance of 116 kilometres.

Famous Places
 Jumma Masjid
 Hazrat Mehndi Peer Dargah 
 Choreshwar Temple 
 Bhatheshwar Temple
 Raj mahel
 Madhuvanti river
 And many more

References

External links
Google Maps for Mendarda

Cities and towns in Junagadh district